The 2010–11 Wichita Thunder season was the 19th season of the CHL franchise in Wichita, Kansas.

Off-season
On April 27, 2010, the Wichita Thunder announced that they hired Kevin McClelland as the new head coach and they also announced that Jason Duda would be the new assistant coach. The Thunder overhauled their roster with only three players returning, Ian Keserich, Jason Woll, and Bobby Hughes.

Regular season

Conference standings

Schedule and results

Pre-season

Regular season

Playoffs
The Wichita Thunder qualified for the playoffs for the first time since 2007. They lost the opening round best-of-five series against the Missouri Mavericks 2 - 3.

Awards and records

Awards

Milestones

Transactions
The Thunder have been involved in the following transactions during the 2010–11 season.
Trades

Player signings

Players re-signed

Lost via waivers

Roster

|}

See also
 2010–11 CHL season

References

External links
 2010–11 Wichita Thunder season at Pointstreak

Wichita Thunder season, 2010-11
Wichita Thunder seasons
W